Pultenaea lapidosa is a species of flowering plant in the family Fabaceae and is endemic to south-eastern Australia. It is an erect to low-lying shrub with linear to narrow elliptic leaves and deep orange and dark red flowers.

Description
The flowers are usually arranged in leafy racemes of ten to twenty-five on the ends of branches. The standard petal is yellow to orange with reddish markings, the wings yellow to orange and the keel dark red.

Taxonomy and naming
Pultenaea lapidosa was first formally described in 1994 by Margaret Corrick in the journal Muelleria from specimens she collected near Omeo in 1986. The specific epithet (lapidosa) means "stony", referring to the favoured habitat of this species.

Distribution and habitat
Stony push-pea grows on stony slopes in heathy understorey of woodland in two disjunct populations in Victoria and on the Central Tablelands of New South Wales.

Conservation status
This hibbertia is classified as "vulnerable" under the Victorian Government Flora and Fauna Guarantee Act 1988.

References

lapidosa
Flora of Victoria (Australia)
Flora of New South Wales
Plants described in 1994